The Chermside bus station, at Chermside, Queensland, is serviced by Translink bus routes. It is part of the Westfield Chermside Shopping Centre. It is in Zone 2 of the Translink integrated public transport system.

Bus routes 
The following bus routes services Chermside bus station:

References

External links 

 Chermside bus station Translink

Bus stations in Brisbane